Dolly Parton's Smoky Mountain Christmas Carol is a stage musical with music and lyrics by Dolly Parton with a book by David H. Bell (adapted by Bell, Paul T. Couch and Curt Wollan). It is an adaptation of Charles Dickens' 1843 novella A Christmas Carol, relocating the story from Victorian London to the 1930s in the Great Smoky Mountains of Tennessee.

Production history

World premiere: Boston (2019) 
The musical had its world premiere at the Colonial Theatre in Boston from December 3-29, 2019. The production was directed by Curt Wollan.

Vancouver (2021) 
The musical made its Canadian premiere at the Stanley Industrial Alliance Stage in Vancouver from November 18, 2021 until January 2, 2022. The production was directed by Bobby Garcia.

London (2022) 
The musical made its UK premiere in the Queen Elizabeth Hall at the Southbank Centre in London from 8 December 2022 to 8 January 2023. The production was choreographed and directed by Alison Pollard.

External links 

 Official US website

References 

2019 musicals
Musicals based on A Christmas Carol
Musicals based on books